The 1947 BAA Finals was the championship round of playoffs following the inaugural Basketball Association of America (BAA)'s 1946–47 season. The Philadelphia Warriors of the Eastern Division faced the Chicago Stags of the Western Division for the inaugural championship, with Philadelphia having home court advantage. Hall of Fame inductee Joe Fulks played for the Warriors in the series.

Background
Philadelphia was not the Eastern Division champion but advanced to the championship round by winning a four-team playoff among the Eastern and Western Division runners-up. Meanwhile, the Eastern and Western Division champions, Washington Capitols and Cleveland Rebels, played one long series to determine the other finalist, a best-of-seven series that Chicago won 4–2. In the runners-up bracket, Philadelphia and New York from the East had first eliminated St. Louis and Chicago from the West, then faced each other, all in best-of-three series. The format was repeated in 1948, and generated another champion from the runners-up bracket.

The five games of the final series were played in seven days, with no days off between consecutive games in the same city (twice). Division champions Washington and Chicago had played the six games of their semifinal series from April 2 to 13, although they too took no days off between consecutive games in the same city (twice). In total, the entire playoff tournament lasted a total of 20 days.

This would be the Stags only appearance in the Finals; the franchise would fold three years later. It would be another 44 years before a Chicago club played for a pro basketball championship, when the Chicago Bulls won the 1991 NBA Finals.

Series summary

Warriors win series 4–1

Game 1

Around 7,900 people attended Game 1.  The Warriors led at halftime 34–20.  Joe Fulks then scored 29 points in the second half, including 21 in the fourth quarter.  Angelo Musi, a guard out of Temple University, scored 19 points himself for Philadelphia as well.  The Stags took an astounding 129 shots, but only knocked down 26 of them, a 20.2 shooting percentage which made it easy for the Warriors to win, 84–71.

Game 2

Fulks was not the scorer he was in Game 1, but he did not have to be, because five other Warrior players scored in double figures, including 18 points from forward Howie Dallmar and 16 from guard Jerry Fleishman.  Chicago did take a brief 69-68 lead until Philadelphia center Art Hillhouse came alive in the fourth quarter.  He scored 7 out of the last 10 points for the Warriors, in route to a second Philadelphia win, 85–74.

Game 3

Game 4

Game 5

With less than a minute remaining, Howie Dallmar snapped an 80–80 tie by nailing a jump shot to seal the very first championship for the Warriors.

Team rosters

Philadelphia Warriors

Chicago Stags

References

External links
 1947 Finals at NBA.com
 1947 BAA Playoffs at Basketball-Reference.com

Finals
1947
Philadelphia Warriors games
Chicago Stags games
1947 in sports in Illinois
1947 in sports in Pennsylvania
BAA Finals, 1947
BAA Finals, 1947
Sports competitions in Philadelphia
Sports competitions in Chicago
April 1947 sports events in the United States